, is a river on the main island of Honshu in Japan. At 176.7 km in length, it is the longest tributary of Tone-gawa. From ancient times, it has been known to cause floods. The river starts in Kinu swamp in the city of Nikkō, Tochigi, within Nikkō National Park.

See also
 Kinugawa Onsen, a spa town within Nikkō
 Keno Province

External links
 (confluence with Tone River)

Rivers of Ibaraki Prefecture
Rivers of Tochigi Prefecture
Rivers of Japan